Spintharus longisoma is an extinct species of comb-footed spider in the family Theridiidae. It was found in Dominican amber.

References

Theridiidae
Spiders described in 1988